Pseudocorticus is a genus of cylindrical bark beetles in the family Zopheridae. There is one described species in Pseudocorticus, P. blairi.

References

Further reading

 
 

Zopheridae
Articles created by Qbugbot